Mecyclothorax sculptonotatus is a species of ground beetle in the subfamily Psydrinae. It was described by Enderlein in 1909.

References

sculptonotatus
Beetles described in 1909